The Tenth Wisconsin Legislature convened from January 14, 1857, to March 9, 1857, in regular session.

This was the first legislative session after the expansion and redistricting of the Senate and Assembly according to an act of the previous session. The Senate grew from 25 to 30 seats; the Assembly grew from 82 to 97 seats.

Senators representing odd-numbered districts were newly elected for this session and were serving the first year of a two-year term.  Assembly members were elected to a one-year term.  Assembly members and odd-numbered senators were elected in the general election of November 4, 1856.  Senators representing even-numbered districts were serving the second year of their two-year term, having been elected in the general election held on November 6, 1855, or were elected in the 1856 election for a newly created district and were serving a one-year term.

Major events
 January 23, 1857: James Rood Doolittle elected United States Senator by the Wisconsin Legislature in Joint Session.
 March 4, 1857: Inauguration of James Buchanan as the 15th President of the United States.
 November 3, 1857: Alexander Randall elected Governor of Wisconsin.

Major legislation
 February 19, 1857: Act relating to the writ of Habeas Corpus to persons claimed as Fugitive Slaves, the right of trial by jury, and to prevent kidnapping in this State, 1857 Act 8.  This was an attempt to make it more difficult to arrest people on accusation that they were fugitive slaves.  It also introduced severe penalties for falsely claiming a person as a fugitive slave.
 February 28, 1857: Act providing for the erection of the main edifice of the State University, 1857 Act 25
 February 28, 1857: Act authorizing the enlargement of the State Capitol, and providing and appropriating means for the payment of the same, 1857 Act 26
 March 4, 1857: Act to extend the right of Suffrage, 1857 Act 44. This was the second attempt to create a referendum which would grant voting rights to African American men in Wisconsin.  The first referendum passed, but was deemed illegitimate.  This referendum would fail in the 1857 election.  Ultimately, the Wisconsin Supreme Court would rule in the 1866 case of Gillespie v. Palmer that the earlier referendum was valid, and that African American men would have the right to vote in the state.
 March 7, 1857: Act to preserve the purity of Elections, 1857 Act 85
 March 9, 1857: Act to provide for the appointment of a Superintendent of Public Property and to define his powers and duties, 1857 Act 95

Party summary

Senate summary

Assembly summary

Sessions
 1st Regular session: January 14, 1857 – March 9, 1857

Leaders

Senate leadership
 President of the Senate: Arthur MacArthur, Sr., Lieutenant Governor
 President pro tempore:

Assembly leadership
 Speaker of the Assembly: Wyman Spooner

Members

Members of the Senate
Members of the Wisconsin Senate for the Tenth Wisconsin Legislature (30):

Members of the Assembly
Members of the Assembly for the Tenth Wisconsin Legislature (97):

Employees

Senate employees
 Chief Clerk: William Henry Brisbane
 Sergeant-at-Arms: Alanson Filer

Assembly employees
 Chief Clerk: William C. Webb
 Sergeant-at-Arms: William C. Rogers

Changes from the 9th Legislature
The most significant structural change to the Legislature between the 9th and 10th sessions was the reapportionment and redistricting of legislative seats.  The new districts were defined in 1856 Wisconsin Act 109, passed into law in the 9th Wisconsin Legislature.

Senate redistricting

Summary of changes

 17 senate districts were left unchanged.
 Dane County went from having one senator to two (11, 26).
 Jefferson County went from having one senator to two (14, 23).
 Marquette County became its own senate district (29), after previously having been in a shared district with Adams, Sauk, and Waushara counties.
 Sheboygan County became its own senate district (1), after previously having been in a shared district with Calumet and Manitowoc counties
 Waukesha County went from two senators to one (10).
 The multi-county, lightly-populated northern and western regions of the state went from two senators to four (2, 27, 28, 30).

Senate districts

Assembly redistricting

Summary of changes
 Brown County became its own assembly district, after previously having been in a shared district with Door and Kewaunee counties.
 Columbia County went from having 2 districts to 3.
 Dane County went from having 5 districts to 6.
 Fond du Lac County went from having 4 districts to 5.
 Green County went from having 1 district to 2.
 Manitowoc County went from having 1 district to 2.
 Marquette County went from having 1 district and 1 shared district with Waushara to having 2 districts.
 Outagamie County became its own assembly district, after previously having been in a shared district with Oconto and Waupaca counties.
 Rock County went from having 4 districts to 5.
 Sauk County went from sharing a district with Adams to having 2 districts of its own.
 Sheboygan County went from having 2 districts to 3.
 Walworth County went from having 6 districts to 4.
 Washington County went from having 2 districts to 3.
 Waupaca County became its own assembly district, after previously having been in a shared district with Oconto and Outagamie counties.
 Waushara County became its own assembly district, after previously having been in a shared district with Marquette
 Winnebago County went from having 2 districts to 3.

Assembly districts

References

External links

1857 in Wisconsin
Wisconsin
Wisconsin legislative sessions